Carlos Jiménez Sánchez (born 10 February 1976) is a Spanish former professional basketball player and current sporting director of Unicaja. He is 2.05 m (6' 8 ") tall. His nickname is "suma y sigue Jiménez", which translated into English is, "add and go on Jiménez."

Player profile
He played as a small forward. He was a good rebounder, using his 205 cm height and his long arms. He was a good defender, and a good free throw shooter.

Professional career
In the 2002-03 NBA Season, Jiménez was on the preseason roster of the Sacramento Kings, as he tried out for the club, but he was cut from the team a week before the start of the regular season. He was disappointed that the Kings released him.  Jiménez never had another NBA experience.

After playing five seasons for Unicaja Málaga, in August 2011 he returned to Asefa Estudiantes, signing a one-year contract. In April 2012, with six games left to finish the Liga ACB, he decided to retire at the end of the season.

However, on 17 September 2012, he returned to professional basketball, by signing a one-month long contract, with an option to extend it for one more month, with his former team Unicaja. He retired in December 2012.

Spain national team
Jiménez played with the senior Spain national team at the 2006 FIBA World Championship, where he won a gold medal. He also won the silver medal at the 2008 Summer Olympics, as Spain lost against Team USA in the gold medal game. After that Olympic competition, Jiménez announced his retirement from the Spain national team, after having been the captain of that group of players. He retired at the time as the Spanish player with the most medals won in international tournaments for the Spain national team.

References

External links

 Carlos Jiménez at acb.com 
 Carlos Jiménez at euroleague.net
 

1976 births
Living people
Baloncesto Málaga players
Basketball players at the 2000 Summer Olympics
Basketball players at the 2004 Summer Olympics
Basketball players at the 2008 Summer Olympics
CB Estudiantes players
Liga ACB players
Medalists at the 2008 Summer Olympics
Olympic basketball players of Spain
Olympic medalists in basketball
Olympic silver medalists for Spain
Small forwards
Spanish men's basketball players
Spanish men's 3x3 basketball players
Basketball players from Madrid
FIBA World Championship-winning players
2006 FIBA World Championship players
2002 FIBA World Championship players
1998 FIBA World Championship players